Terje Haugland (born 11 April 1944) is a former Norwegian long jumper.

He was a nephew of Jens Edv. Haugland, son of Eugen Haugland and father of Hanne Haugland.

He finished eleventh at the 1969 European Championships, thirteenth at the 1970 European Indoor Championships and thirteenth at the 1971 European Championships. He never competed at the Summer Olympics. He became Norwegian champion in long jump in 1969 and 1971. He represented Haugesund IL and IK Tjalve.

His personal best jump was 7.87 metres, achieved in July 1970 at Bislett stadion. This result places him fourth among Norwegian long jumpers, only behind Kristen Fløgstad, Finn Bendixen and Thomas Mellin-Olsen.

References

1944 births
Living people
Norwegian male long jumpers
20th-century Norwegian people